This article comprises three sortable tables of major mountain peaks of Canada.

The summit of a mountain or hill may be measured in three principal ways:
The topographic elevation of a summit measures the height of the summit above a geodetic sea level.  The first table below ranks the 100 highest major summits of Canada by elevation.
The topographic prominence of a summit is a measure of how high the summit rises above its surroundings.  The second table below ranks the 50 most prominent summits of Canada.
The topographic isolation (or radius of dominance) of a summit measures how far the summit lies from its nearest point of equal elevation.  The third table below ranks the 50 most isolated major summits of Canada.



Highest major summits

Of the 100 highest major summits of Canada, five peaks exceed  elevation, 19 peaks exceed , 67 peaks exceed , and all 100 peaks equal or exceed  elevation.

Of these 100 peaks, 61 are located in British Columbia, 28 in Yukon, 13 in Alberta, and one in the Northwest Territories.  Five of these peaks lie on the international border between Yukon and Alaska, four lie on the international border between British Columbia and Alaska, three lie on the border between British Columbia and Alberta, and one lies on the border between British Columbia and Yukon.

Most prominent summits

Of the 50 most prominent summits of Canada, only Mount Logan exceeds  of topographic prominence, five peaks exceed , 41 peaks exceed , and all 50 peaks equal or exceed  of topographic prominence.  All of these peaks are ultra-prominent summits.

Of these 50 peaks, 34 are located in British Columbia, nine in Yukon, six in Nunavut, and three in Alberta.  Three of these peaks lie on the international border between Yukon and Alaska, one lies on the international border between British Columbia and Alaska, two lie on the border between British Columbia and Alberta, and two lie on the border between British Columbia and Yukon.

Most isolated major summits

Of the 50 most isolated major summits of Canada, 12 peaks exceed  of topographic isolation, 31 peaks exceed , and all 50 peaks exceed  of topographic isolation.

Of these 50 peaks, 17 are located in British Columbia, 13 in Nunavut, seven in Yukon, four in Newfoundland and Labrador, four in Quebec, three in the Northwest Territories, two in Alberta, and one each in Nova Scotia and New Brunswick.  Two of these peaks lie on the international border between British Columbia and Alaska, and two lie on the border between British Columbia and Alberta.

Gallery

See also

List of mountain peaks of North America
List of mountain peaks of Greenland

List of mountain peaks of the Rocky Mountains
List of mountain peaks of the United States
List of mountain peaks of México
List of mountain peaks of Central America
List of mountain peaks of the Caribbean
Canada
Geography of Canada
:Category:Mountains of Canada
commons:Category:Mountains of Canada
Physical geography
Topography
Topographic elevation
Topographic prominence
Topographic isolation

Notes

References

External links

Natural Resources Canada (NRC)
Canadian Geographical Names @ NRC
Bivouac.com
Peakbagger.com
Peaklist.org
Peakware.com
Summitpost.org

 

Lists of landforms of Canada
Canada, List Of Mountain Peaks Of
Canada, List Of Mountain Peaks Of
Canada, List Of Mountain Peaks Of